Cheerleader Massacre is a 2003 American B-movie slasher film directed by Jim Wynorski and written by Lenny Juliano. The film stars Tamie Sheffield, Charity Rahmer, and Erin Byron. The seventh released film in the Massacre franchise, the film is a direct sequel to The Slumber Party Massacre (1982), with Brinke Stevens reprising her role as Linda Dawn Grant and including a flashback sequence to that film but with a story of its own. As in that film and its sequels, much of the film's appeal relies on female nudity, sex, and gore.

The film was produced by Roger Corman and lensed by Jim Wynorski, shot as "Slumber Party Massacre 4" before being renamed by Corman.

The DVD was released on March 25, 2003. The special features include trailers, actor bios, audio commentaries, and a making of featurette.

Plot
Several high school cheerleaders become stranded at a cabin in the snowy wilderness after their van breaks down. During the night, as the girls play games and have sex with their boyfriends, someone begins murdering them one by one.

Cast
Tamie Sheffield as Ms. Hendricks
Charity Rahmer as Parker Jameson
Erin Byron as Angela Caruso
Lenny Juliano (credited as Lunk Johnson) as Buzzy
Bill Langlois Monroe (credited as E. Eddie Edwards) as Sheriff Murdock
Samantha Phillips as Officer Phillips. Phillips reprises her role from the unreleased Sorority House Massacre: The Final Exam.
GiGi Erneta as Deputy Adams
April Flowers (credited as Diana Espin) as Tammy Rae
Nikki Fritz as Debbie
Tylo Tyler as Ryan
Brad Beck as Mark
Summer Williams as Shelley
Brinke Stevens as Linda
Melissa Brasselle as Detective DeMarco
Julie Lisandro (credited as Julie Corgill) as Dina

Sequel
The film was followed by a very loose sequel named Cheerleader Massacre 2 in 2011.

References

External links

2003 films
2003 direct-to-video films
2003 horror films
American teen horror films
Films directed by Jim Wynorski
American slasher films
2000s slasher films
Direct-to-video horror films
Films about fratricide and sororicide
Films about fraternities and sororities
Massacre (franchise)
2000s English-language films
2000s American films